is a Japanese manga artist and a former member of Dynamic Productions. After finishing high school, he joined Dynamic Productions and while working as Go Nagai's assistant, he debuted with Hello! Love for the Gakken Naka ni Course magazine. His most representative work is the manga version of the anime Mobile Suit Gundam published from 1979-05 to 1980-02 by Akita Shoten in the magazine Boken Oh. He has also worked in some manga versions of Cutie Honey and UFO Robot Grendizer.

In the 1990s, after working in Josei manga, he took a break from manga publications which is still in effect.

External links
Tankōbon list of Yū Okazaki at Dynamic Land
Yu Okazaki (work list) at BEN's homepage
 

Manga artists from Mie Prefecture
1951 births
Living people